Pargny-la-Dhuys is a commune in the Aisne department in Hauts-de-France in northern France.

Population

Sights
The commune's church is St. Martin Church, which has Gothic arches and a slender belfry.

Pargny-la-Dhuys is a former forge that was built on an iron mine belonging to the County of Braine in the fifteenth century .

The last lord of the commune was the Count de la Tour du Pin.

This is the location of the catchment of the : an aqueduct of 131 km built between 1863 and 1865 that now supplies the city of Paris and the park at Marne-la-Vallee with water.

See also
Communes of the Aisne department

References

External links

Pargny-la-Dhuys on the Official website of the tourist office of the Canton of Condé-en-Brie

Communes of Aisne